The following is a list of episodes and movies for the CBS television show The Waltons.

Series overview

Episodes

Pilot (1971)

Season 1 (1972–1973)
Consisted of 25 episodes airing on CBS.
This is the first season to have the 1971–1978 Lorimar Productions "LP" logo.

Season 2 (1973–1974)
Consisted of 25 episodes airing on CBS.

Season 3 (1974–1975)
Consisted of 25 episodes airing on CBS.

Season 4 (1975–1976)
Consisted of 25 episodes airing on CBS.

Season 5 (1976–1977)
Consisted of 25 episodes airing on CBS.
This is the last season to feature Ellen Corby and Richard Thomas before leaving the show.  Thomas would return in 1993 during the reunion movies.

Season 6 (1977–1978)
Consisted of 26 episodes airing on CBS.
Ellen Corby returns to the show in this season.
This is the last season to have the 1971–1978 Lorimar Productions "LP" logo.

Season 7 (1978–1979)
Consisted of 24 episodes airing on CBS.
This is the first season to have the 1978–1986 Lorimar Productions "Line of Doom" logo.

Season 8 (1979–1980)
Consisted of 24 episodes airing on CBS.
This is also the last season to feature Reckless the dog.

Season 9 (1980–1981)
Consisted of 22 episodes airing on CBS.
This is the last season to have the 1978–1986 Lorimar Productions "Line of Doom" logo.

Reunion movies (1982–1997)

Retrospective (2010)

References

Waltons, The
The Waltons